Polypenco may refer to:

 Polyoxymethylene, an engineering thermoplastic, genericized trademark name polypenco
 Nippon Polypenco Limited, a Japanese company; See Nylatron